North Lakes Academy (NLA) is a charter school located in Forest Lake, Minnesota, United States. It serves students in grades K–12 from Forest Lake and surrounding areas. Established in 1999, NLA currently educates approximately 400 students with class sizes averaging 22 students.

Activities

Fall Activities
 Boys' Soccer
 Cross Country
 Debate
 Girls' Soccer
 Volleyball
Winter Activities
 Boys' Basketball
 Girls' Basketball
 Robotics
Spring Activities
 Baseball
 Drama
 Softball
 Trap Shooting
 Track
Miscellaneous Activities
 Clubs
 Marching Band
 Student Council

External links
North Lakes Academy

Schools in Washington County, Minnesota
Public high schools in Minnesota
Public middle schools in Minnesota
Charter schools in Minnesota
Educational institutions established in 1999
1999 establishments in Minnesota